Production Courtyard is a themed land at Walt Disney Studios Park in Disneyland Resort Paris. A large section of its original 2002 footprint is now cordoned off as part of the park's Hollywood Boulevard placemaking project, including the addition of The Twilight Zone Tower of Terror. It is expected this development will eventually encompass the whole of Production Courtyard with a full Hollywood theme.

In addition, one of the original attractions which opened with the park on 16 March 2002, Walt Disney Television Studios, was closed to become the Stitch Live! interactive CGI and the former attraction, Playhouse Disney Live on Stage shows.

Attractions and entertainment

Studio D
Disney Junior Dream Factory 
Stitch Live!
The Twilight Zone Tower of Terror
Magic Over Disney
Studio Theater

Future attractions and entertainment
Studio Theater
Pixar: We Belong Together

Former attractions and entertainment

Studio Theater
CinéMagique (2002–2017)
Walt Disney Television Studios
Disney Junior - Live on Stage! (2009-2019)
Star Wars: A Galactic Celebration (2017-2020)
Star Wars - A Galaxy Far, Far Away
Studio Tram Tour: Behind the Magic (2002-2020)

Restaurants

La Terrasse
Hollywood & Lime
Speciality Ice Cream
Kool Zone
Studio Catering Co.

Former restaurants
Café Café
Restaurant des Stars

Shops

Tower Hotel Gifts
Television Studios Kiosk
Pin Trading Station

References

Themed areas in Walt Disney Parks and Resorts
Walt Disney Studios Park